George Anderson (20 January 1826 – 27 November 1902)  was an English cricketer, who played first-class cricket for Sheffield Cricket Club from 1850 to 1862 and then for Yorkshire County Cricket Club from its inception in 1863 until 1869.

Life
He was born in Aiskew, Bedale, Yorkshire and showed athletic aptitude as a high and long jumper and as a cricketer. His cricket was greatly improved by the visit to Bedale of the eminent bowler William Clarke in 1848. He was employed as a clerk in his youth before making cricket his profession in early manhood.

Anderson appeared at Lord's in 1851, when he played for the North against the South, and for the Players against the Gentlemen in 1855. From 1857 until 1864 he was a member of the All England XIs captained by William Clarke, and George Parr. His most successful season was in 1864, when in first-class matches he averaged 42 runs an innings, and scored 99 not out for Yorkshire against Notts. He captained the Yorkshire team for a few seasons and in May 1869 a match was played for his benefit at Dewsbury between the All England XI and the United All England XI.

Anderson was a right-handed batsman. He played in 99 first-class games, mainly for Yorkshire teams, scoring 2,535 runs at an average of 16.35, with a highest score of 99 not out.

His style as a batsman was described as "the model of manliness"; he had a good defence, and though he took time to get set, he was in his day the hardest and cleanest hitter of the best bowling.

In 1862, he made a drive for eight runs at the Oval, when playing for the North of England against Surrey. Another hit by him off Bennett, the Kent slow bowler, was reputed to have pitched farther than any previously recorded at the Oval.

On retiring from professional cricketing, Anderson became in 1873 actuary of the Bedale Savings Bank, and held the office until the bank's failure in 1894. He died at Bedale on 27 November 1902.

References

Attribution

1826 births
1902 deaths
Yorkshire cricketers
All-England Eleven cricketers
English cricketers
English cricketers of 1826 to 1863
English cricketers of 1864 to 1889
People from Bedale
Players cricketers
Cricketers from Yorkshire
Yorkshire with Stockton-on-Tees cricketers
North v South cricketers
Yorkshire and Durham cricketers